The 2021–22 Oral Roberts Golden Eagles women's basketball represent Oral Roberts University in the 2021–22 NCAA Division I women's basketball season. The Golden Eagles, led by tenth year head coach Misti Cussen, compete in the Summit League. They play home games in Mabee Center in Tulsa, Oklahoma.

Previous season
The Golden Eagles went 6–15 overall and 4–8 in conference play, finishing seventh.

Oral Roberts played previous year champion South Dakota in the quarterfinals lost 66-89.

Offseason

Departures

Additions

2021 recruiting class

Preseason

Summit League Preseason poll
The Summit League Preseason poll and other preseason awards was released on October 12, 2021 with the Golden Eagles selected to finish in sixth place in the Summit League.

Preseason All-Summit teams
The Golden Eagles had one player selected to the preseason all-Summit teams.

Second team

Keni Jo Lippe

Roster

Schedule

|-
!colspan=9 style=| Exhibition

|-
!colspan=9 style=| Non-conference regular season (5-6)

|-
!colspan=9 style=| Summit League regular season (10-8)

|-
!colspan=9 style=| Summit League Women's Tournament (1-1)

Source:

Team and individual statistics

Honors

Summit League Player of the Week
 February 21, 2022 – Tirzah Moore

Postseason awards

Freshman of the Year
Tirzah Moore

All-Summit League Team
Tirzah Moore, Second team<
Summit League All-Newcomer Team
Tirzah Moore

References

Oral Roberts Golden Eagles women's basketball seasons
Oral Roberts
Oral Roberts
Oral Roberts